Barber Peak is a  elevation volcanic plug located on Navajo Nation land in San Juan County of northwest New Mexico, United States. It is a prominent landmark set one-half mile east of U.S. Route 491, approximately 15 miles south of the community of Shiprock, New Mexico. Its nearest higher neighbor is Table Mesa, one mile to the west, and Cathedral Cliff is set 1.5 mile to the northwest. Barber Peak is set in the northeastern part of the Navajo Volcanic Field, a volcanic field that includes intrusions and flows of minette and other unusual igneous rocks which formed around 30 million years ago during the Oligocene. In the Navajo language, this geographical feature is called Tsé Naajin, meaning "black downward rock."

Climate 
According to the Köppen climate classification system, Barber Peak is located in a semi-arid climate zone with cold winters and hot summers.  Precipitation runoff from this feature drains into the San Juan River drainage basin.

See also
 Rock formations in the United States

References

External links
 Weather forecast: National Weather Service
 Barber Peak rock climbing: Mountainproject.com

Rock formations of New Mexico
Landmarks in New Mexico
Volcanic plugs of the United States
Diatremes of New Mexico
Landforms of San Juan County, New Mexico
Geography of the Navajo Nation
Oligocene volcanism
North American 1000 m summits